1871 is a non-profit digital startup incubator located in the Merchandise Mart, Chicago, Illinois. The organization was founded in 2012 by J.B. Pritzker and is the flagship project of The Chicagoland Entrepreneurial Center (CEC),  a non-profit organization that supports entrepreneurs on their path to building high-growth, sustainable businesses that serve as platforms for economic development and civic leadership.  Led by CEO Betsy Ziegler, 1871 has become a major hub of Chicago's technology and entrepreneurial ecosystem and hosts over 400 early-stage companies as well as nationally recognized accelerators, industry-specific incubators, and tech talent schools.  1871 was recognized in 2019 by UBI Global as the Top Private Business Incubator in the World and Most Promising Incubator for Women Founders.

History 
In the early 2000s, some of the major players in Chicago's economy were the Chicagoland Entrepreneurial Center, the Chicago Innovation Awards, Chicago Ideas Week and TechNexus.  Due to emerging competition in the space, in 2012 TechNexus decided to shift their target market audience to more well-developed and established companies such as the Illinois Technology Association, Emerge, and 200 more.  This allowed for 1871 to open in Chicago's ecosystem to help foster new enterprises and support corporations that were already based in Chicago. In 2020, 1871 acquired the Illinois Technology Association.  In 2016, Harvard Business School published a case study on the emergence of Chicago's ecosystem

Community 
1871 offers work space to over 200 companies. Their partnerships and sponsorships with UPS, Google For Entrepreneurs and Chase give the people working there broader exposure to the greater tech space. 1871 also offers free work space to students from Trinity Christian College, DePaul University, University of Illinois, Illinois Institute of Technology or DeVry University, University of Chicago, Northwestern and Loyola. 1871 also hosts networking events and workshops.

A number of innovation spaces specializing in specific sectors have been established since 1871 was created.  These include the  Connectory (an 1871 partner specializing in  IoT), Matter (healthcare) and Relish Works (food service).

Funding controversy 
As a non-profit incubator, 1871 takes money from the state to bring in capital for these tech startups. Critics including CEO of Novel Coworking, Bill Bennet, believe "we shouldn't use the state money that way," stating that "it doesn't make sense to me why we should use taxpayer funds to subsidize one place." One of the main arguments against the funding is that there are other non-state funded avenues for statups to find affordable working spaces, like WeWork. Tullman, CEO of 1871, argued at the time that the space provides resources other coworking spaces could not, like mentoring, workshops and events for the entrepreneurial community.

The tax statements of 1871's parent company, Chicagoland Entrepreneurial Center (CEC) are public. The Chicago Tribune estimates 27% of their 2013-14 earnings were reported on their tax statement as "salaries, compensation and benefits."

Expansion 
In April 2016, 1871 officially opened their 3.0 expansion, which enlarges the space by another 41,000 square feet. This expansion created more classrooms and office spaces for some of their largest companies such as Impact Engine, Accenture and Options Away. The expansion was funded entirely by themselves and the Chicago Entrepreneurial Center, with no government grant assistance The estimated encounters of 1,000 people they have on a daily basis has grown to 2,000 people with the 3.0 Expansion. Over 500 companies are now working out of 1871.

Further Reading and Viewing 
This is 1871 by Chicago poet Nate Marshall, Created for the facility's grand opening, February 29, 2012.

References 

2012 establishments in Illinois
Companies based in Chicago